The Blohm & Voss BV 950 was an anti-shipping air-launched glide torpedo developed in two variants, the L10 Friedensengel and L11 Schneewittchen.

Although several hundreds were manufactured during development and trials conducted, neither type entered service.

Design
The device comprised a small upper body with wings and tail, clamped on top of an air-launched torpedo.

In operation, it was dropped by an attacking aircraft from a safe altitude and distance, gliding down towards the target vessel and, as it approached the target, a timed fuse opened a small parachute which was attached to the glider body. It continued down and impacted the water a short distance from the target. When the torpedo met the surface of the water, the glider body automatically detached and was pulled back out of the way by the parachute, while the torpedo motor started and drove it to impact its target.

The L 11 was developed for launch aircraft speeds up to

L 10 Friedensengel
Development of the L10 Friedensengel (Angel of Peace) began in 1942.

The main launch aircraft for the L 10 were the Heinkel He 111 and the Junkers Ju 88.

The L 10 was put into production and many hundreds built, but was eventually cancelled before it could be used operationally.

L 11 Schneewittchen
The L 11 Schneewittchen (Snow White) was designed to be launched from the Arado Ar 234. This required a much higher airspeed than the L 10, so an additional braking parachute was deployed immediately after launch, to slow it down to its target approach speed.

The L 11 was also put into production but cancelled in December 1944. It was never used operationally.

See also

References

Notes

Anti-ship missiles of Germany
BV 950